Taekwondo at the 2010 Asian Games was held in Guangzhou, China from November 17 to 20, 2010. Men's and women's competitions were held in eight weight categories for each gender. All competition took place at the Guangdong Gymnasium. Each country was limited to having 6 men and 6 women.

Schedule

Medalists

Men

Women

Medal table

Participating nations
A total of 247 athletes from 37 nations competed in taekwondo at the 2010 Asian Games:

References

Results

External links
Official website

 
2010 Asian Games events
Asian Games
2010